Birendra Krishna Bhadra (1905–1991) was a radio broadcaster, playwright, actor, narrator and theatre director from Kolkata, India and a contemporary of Pankaj Mallick and Kazi Nazrul Islam.
He worked for the All India Radio, India's National Radio broadcaster for several years during its early, starting 1930s, and during this period he produced and adapted several plays.

Today, he is most known for his soaring Sanskrit recitation and India's oldest radio show, Mahishashura Mardini (1931), a collection of shlokas and songs broadcast by All India Radio Calcutta (now Kolkata) at 4:00 am, in the dawn of Mahalaya. He also acted and directed several plays in Bengali theatre and even wrote the screenplay for the film, Nishiddha Phal (1955). A Bengali short film Birendra Krishna Bhadra - The Voice Since 1936 Was released In 2019 By Haalum Digital Media Entertainment Pvt. Ltd.

Early life and education
Birendra Krishna Bhadra was born on 4 August 1905, to Roy Bahadur Kalikrishna and Sarala Bala Devi at a rented house in Ahiritola his maternal home, in north Calcutta (now Kolkata). Later the family moved to 7, Ramdhan Mitra Lane, the house bought by his grandmother Yogo Maya Devi. His father, Kali Krishna Bhadra was a linguist, fluent in 14 languages, and employed as an interpreter in a lower court and later became a known figure in the Bengali literary circles of the time. Kali Krishna married Sarala Bala Devi the second child of the then famous Police Court lawyer Kalicharan Ghosh, and in 1927 was awarded the title of Roy Bahadur. Roy Bahadur Kali Krishna had two sons, Bhupendra Krishna and Birendra Krishna. In 1926, Birendra Krishna Bhadra passed Intermediate, and in 1928 graduated from Scottish Church College, Kolkata.

Career
He adapted and restructured several classics to produce notable radio plays. In the 1930s All India Radio, Kolkata started broadcasting a two-hour program called Mahishashura Mardini which describes the epic battle of goddess Durga with the demon king Mahishashura. The script of this program was written by Bani Kumar and the music was directed by Pankaj Kumar Mallik. It was recited by Bhadra. It was first broadcast on the Mahalaya of 1931. Since then, All India Radio have broadcast this programme on the Mahalaya of every year except 1976. The programme, which started off as a live-performance, has been broadcast in its pre-recorded format since 1952. 

Bhadra wrote some plays including Mess No. 49, and directed a theatre production Sahib Bibi Gulam, a stage adaptation of the celebrated novel of famous author, the Bimal Mitra. In 1952, he dramatised Bankim Chandra Chattopadhyay's novel Subarna Golak which was filmed in the same name in 1981. He also produced the famous radio drama Shahjahan, based on an eponymous historical play by Dwijendralal Ray. Chhabi Biswas played Shahjahan in that radio drama. It became immensely popular among the masses and is still considered as a classic Bengali Radio-drama.

Legacy
His rendition, Mahisasura Mardini, is still played by All India Radio, every Mahalaya, marking the beginning of Durga Puja festivities. So popular was his version of the recitation that when in 1976, the voice of noted Bengali actor, Uttam Kumar was employed for the programme, it didn't get a favorable response from the audience and it was shifted back to the original version of Birendra Krishna Bhadra.

Subhasish Mukherjee portrayed him in his biopic Mahalaya, written and directed by Soumik Sen, highlighting the 1976 fiasco. Jisshu Sengupta portrayed the role of Uttam Kumar.

On the Mahalaya day in 2006, Sujata Bhadra, daughter of the late Birendra Krishna Bhadra, got a cheque for Rs 50,917 from music company, Saregama India Ltd as a royalty for her father's famous work.

Works
 Hitopadesa, Publisher: Hanthawaddy publication, 1948.
 Bisvarūpa-darśana. Publisher: Kathakali, 1963.
 Rana-berana, Publisher: Bihar Sahitya Bhavan, 1965.
 Bratakathā samagra, Publisher: Mandala end Sansa, 1985.
 Śrīmadbhagabata: sampurna dvādaśa skandha, with Upendracandra Śāstri. Publisher: Mandala eyāṇḍa Sansa, 1990.
• Garstin Place'er Saheb Bhoot.

Plays
 Blackout
 Sat Tulsi'' 1940
he wrote a script of a Bengali movie name mahisasur vadh

References

External links
 
 A Short Biography of Birendra Krishna Bhadra
 Birendra Krishna Bhadra Tribute

1905 births
1991 deaths
20th-century Bengalis
Male actors from Kolkata
Scottish Church College alumni
University of Calcutta alumni
Indian male stage actors
Durga Puja
Indian male radio actors
Indian male dramatists and playwrights
Indian theatre directors
Bengali theatre
All India Radio people
20th-century Indian dramatists and playwrights
20th-century Indian singers
Singers from Kolkata
Dramatists and playwrights from West Bengal
Writers from Kolkata
20th-century Indian male writers
20th-century Indian male singers